Agelaea pentagyna is a species of flowering plant in the family Connaraceae. It is found in Africa.

The larvae of the moth Paraccra mimesa feed on the fruits of A. pentagyna.

See also 
 List of Southern African indigenous trees and woody lianes

References

External links 

 Agelaea pentagyna at The Plant List
 Agelaea pentagyna at Tropicos

Connaraceae
Plants described in 1882
Flora of Africa
Taxa named by Henri Ernest Baillon
Taxa named by Jean-Baptiste Lamarck